Burke Jones (April 25, 1903 – January 30, 1983) was an American soccer player.  He earned three caps with the U.S. national team in 1924.  His first two caps came in the 1924 Summer Olympics.  The U.S. won its first game 1-0 against Estonia, but lost to Uruguay in the quarterfinals.  Following its elimination from the tournament, the U.S. played two exhibition games.  Jones played the first, a win over Poland.  That was Jones' last game with the national team.  At the time of the Olympics, he played for the Bridgevill Football Club.

References

1903 births
1983 deaths
People from Bridgeville, Pennsylvania
Sportspeople from the Pittsburgh metropolitan area
United States men's international soccer players
Olympic soccer players of the United States
Footballers at the 1924 Summer Olympics
Soccer players from Pennsylvania
Association football goalkeepers
American soccer players